Labraza is a town located in the province of Álava (Araba), in the autonomous community of Basque Country, northern Spain. It is located in the municipality of Oyón-Oion.

External links 
 News about Labraza 
 Images from Labraza 
 Blog about Labraza 

Populated places in Álava